is a Japanese jazz saxophonist.

Igarashi did not begin playing saxophone until the age of 19, but within a year was playing in a band led by Shungo Sawada. He played with Shotaro Moriyasu in 1954 and following this played with a series of large ensembles, such as the West Liners, Nobuo Hara's Sharps and Flats, The Blue Coats, and the orchestra of Shigenori Obara.

Discography

References
 Kazunori Sugiyama, "Akitoshi Igarashi". The New Grove Dictionary of Jazz. 2nd edition, ed. Barry Kernfeld.

Japanese jazz saxophonists
Musicians from Tokyo
1932 births
Living people
21st-century saxophonists